La Montagne Sainte-Victoire vue du bosquet du Château Noir is a 1904 oil on canvas landscape painting by the French artist Paul Cézanne. The ostensible subject is the painter's familiar Montagne Sainte-Victoire and it is part of a series the artist did of the promontory between 1904 and 1906. 

In 2014 the work was sold by the Edsel and Eleanor Ford House in Grosse Pointe Shores, Michigan for $100 million dollars $US in a private sale to the State of Qatar.

See also
List of paintings by Paul Cézanne
List of most expensive paintings

References

1904 paintings
Paintings by Paul Cézanne
Landscape paintings